Paulin Soumanou Vieyra (31 January 1925 – 4 November 1987) was a Dahomeyan/Senegalese film director and historian. As he lived in Senegal after the age of 10, he is more associated with that nation.

Background
He was born in Porto Novo, Dahomey, and educated in Paris, France, where he studied at the Institut des hautes études cinématographiques. In 1955 in Paris he shot the first Francophone African film, Afrique sur Seine. His other important achievements for film in Africa include founding the "Fédération panafricaine des cinéastes" in 1969.

In 1971 he was a member of the jury at the 7th Moscow International Film Festival. Two years later, he was a member of the jury at the 8th Moscow International Film Festival. In 1985 he was a member of the jury at the 14th Moscow International Film Festival.

He died in Paris in 1987, at the age of 62.

Personal life

In 1961 he married poet Myriam Warner of Guadeloupe. One of his sisters is Justine Vieyra, born in Parakou.

Works

Films
 1954 : C'était il y a quatre ans
 1955 : Afrique-sur-Seine
 1957 : L'Afrique à Moscou
 1958 : Le Niger aujourd’hui
 1959 : Les présidents Senghor et Modibo Keita ; Avec les Africaines à Vienne ; Présence Africaine à Rome
 1960 : Indépendance du Cameroun, Togo, Congo, Madagascar
 1961 : Une nation est née
 1963 : Lamb ; Voyage du président Senghor en Italie ; Voyage présidentiel en URSS
 1964 : Avec l’ensemble national ; Écrit du Caire ; Sindiely ; Voyage du président Senghor au Brésil
 1965 : N'Diongane
 1966 : Le Sénégal au festival national des arts nègres ; Môl
 1967 : Au marché ; La bicyclette ; Le gâteau ; Le rendez-vous
 1974 : Écrit de Dakar ; L’art plastique
 1976 : L'Habitat rural au Sénégal ; L’Habitat urbain au Sénégal
 1981 : Birago Diop ; En résidence surveillée, L’envers du décor ; Les oiseaux
 1982 : Iba N'diaye

Books
 Le Cinéma et l'Afrique, 1969
 Sembène Ousmane cinéaste, 1972
 Le Cinéma africain des origines à 1973, 1975
 Le Cinéma au Sénégal, 1983

Notes

References
 

1925 births
1987 deaths
Senegalese film directors
Film historians
Beninese expatriates in France
Emigrants from Dahomey to Senegal